Vesta M. Roy (March 26, 1925February 9, 2002) was a Republican New Hampshire politician. She was the first woman to serve as both the President of the New Hampshire Senate and acting governor of New Hampshire. She began her brief time as acting governor when the sitting governor fell ill and died prior to the end of his term.

Early life 
Vesta M. Roy was born Detroit, Michigan on March 26, 1925. She graduated from Wayne State University.

Career 
After initially being rejected in the United States for being too young, Roy crossed the border and served the Royal Canadian Air Force from 1943 to 1945 during World War II, and was named Leading Air Woman. She then took a job with Prudential Insurance Company as a Special Agent. In 1974, She also became the first woman to serve as Rockingham County Commissioner. Roy became a member of the New Hampshire House from 1972 to 1973 as a member of the Republican Party. She was a delegate to the New Hampshire Constitutional Convention. Roy served as a state senator from 1978 until 1986.

Roy became President of the New Hampshire Senate in December 1982, becoming the first woman in New Hampshire's history to hold that title. When Governor Hugh Gallen became ill, Roy performed the duties of governor. Gallen died on December 29, 1982, leaving Roy to serve as Acting Governor of the state for seven days from 1982 to 1983. Roy did not formally take the oath of office to become governor because doing so would have required her to give up her Senate seat. The governor-elect, John H. Sununu, was sworn in on January 6, 1983, ending Roy's brief term. Roy was named 1983 New Hampshire Woman of the Year.  She served as an adviser to the New Hampshire campaigns of Republican presidential candidates Gerald Ford, Ronald Reagan, and George H. W. Bush.

Personal life and death 
She was married to optometrist Dr. Albert Roy, with whom she had five children. She had eight grandchildren. She died on February 9, 2002, at her home in Kenmore, New York, at the age of 76 and was buried at Saint Joseph's Cemetery in East Chelmsford, Massachusetts.

See also
List of female governors in the United States

References

External links
 The Vesta Roy Excellence in Public Service Series
 

1925 births
2002 deaths
20th-century American politicians
Republican Party governors of New Hampshire
Republican Party New Hampshire state senators
Politicians from Dearborn, Michigan
People from Kenmore, New York
Presidents of the New Hampshire Senate
Women state governors of the United States
Women state legislators in New Hampshire
20th-century American women politicians
New York (state) Republicans